François Simon (born October 28, 1968, at Troyes, France) is a French former professional road bicycle racer. He was professional from 1991 to 2002. He is the brother of Régis, Pascal and Jérôme, all professional cyclists. In the 2001 Tour de France, Simon wore the yellow jersey as leader of the general classification for three days and finished as best French finisher in that Tour. Other career highlights include a stage win in the 1992 Giro d'Italia, two stage wins in the Tour de l'Avenir, stage wins in Circuit de la Sarthe, Critérium du Dauphiné Libéré and Paris–Nice as well as being road race champion of France in 1999.

Major results

1991
 6th Grand Prix d'Isbergues
 9th Trophée des Grimpeurs
 9th Giro dell'Etna
1992
 1st Stage 15 Giro d'Italia
 1st Overall Mi-Août Bretonne
 1st Stage 3 Tour du Poitou Charentes et de la Vienne
 2nd Overall Tour de l'Avenir
1st Stages 5 & 11 (ITT)
 7th Trophée des Grimpeurs
1993
 2nd Overall Tour du Poitou Charentes et de la Vienne
1st Stage 1
 2nd Overall Tour de l'Avenir
 2nd GP de la Ville de Rennes
 4th Overall Ronde van Nederland
 4th Overall Tour d'Armorique
 7th Cholet-Pays de Loire
 8th GP de Denain
 9th A Travers le Morbihan
1994
 2nd A Travers le Morbihan
 3rd Grand Prix d'Ouverture La Marseillaise
 5th Overall Grand Prix du Midi Libre
 6th GP du canton d'Argovie
 9th Trophée des Grimpeurs
1995
 3rd Overall Étoile de Bessèges
 8th Trophée des Grimpeurs
 8th GP de la Ville de Rennes
1996
 1st Stage 2 Critérium du Dauphiné Libéré
 4th Tour de Vendée
 8th Grand Prix d'Ouverture La Marseillaise
 10th Overall Circuit Cycliste Sarthe
1st Stage 4b
 10th Classic Haribo
1997
 3rd Overall Route du Sud
 5th Paris–Camembert
 6th Overall Critérium du Dauphiné Libéré
 9th Overall Grand Prix du Midi Libre
 9th Grand Prix de la Ville de Lillers
1998
 5th Grand Prix de Villers-Cotterêts
 7th Overall Rheinland-Pfalz Rundfahrt
 9th Overall Volta a la Comunitat Valenciana
1999
 1st  Road race, National Road Championships
 1st Châteauroux Classic
 5th Overall Grand Prix du Midi Libre
 5th Grand Prix de Wallonie
 9th Overall Critérium du Dauphiné Libéré
 9th GP de la Ville de Rennes
 10th Overall Critérium International
2000
 1st Ronde d'Aix-en-Provence
 4th Overall Paris–Nice
1st Stage 5
2001
 1st  Mountains classification, Tour Méditerranéen
 6th Overall Tour de France
Held  for three days
 9th Tour du Finistère
 10th Overall Grand Prix du Midi Libre
2002
 8th Overall Circuit Cycliste de la Sarthe
 9th Tour de la Somme

Grand Tour general classification results timeline

External links 

Official Tour de France results for François Simon

1968 births
Living people
French male cyclists
French Giro d'Italia stage winners
Sportspeople from Troyes
Cyclists from Grand Est